Pulhamite was a patented anthropic rock material invented by James Pulham (1820–1898) of the firm James Pulham and Son of Broxbourne in Hertfordshire.  It was widely used for rock gardens and grottos.

Overview
Pulhamite, which usually looked like gritty sandstone,  was used to join natural rocks together or crafted to simulate natural stone features. It was so realistic that it fooled some geologists of the era. The recipe went to the grave with him. Modern analysis of surviving original Pulhamite have shown it to be a blend of sand, 
Portland cement and clinker sculpted over a core of rubble and crushed bricks.

 Neo-Norman gatehouse and folly at Benington Lordship in Hertfordshire
Rockery, Burslem Park
 Cascade and Rock Garden, Ramsgate,
 Courtstairs Chine, Ramsgate,
 Garden Folly, Sydenham Hill Wood, Sydenham, London.
 Grottoes at Dewstow Gardens, South Wales
 Dunorlan Park, Tunbridge Wells
 Felixstowe Spa and Winter Garden, Suffolk 
 Fernery and waterfall, Bromley Palace Park, Bromley
 Grotto, Wotton House, Surrey
 Water course and pump tower, The Dell, Englefield Green 
 Henley Hall, Shropshire
 Lake and rockery, Milton Mount Gardens, Crawley  
 Leonardslee, rockery in Grade I listed gardenn at Lower Beeding, near Horsham, West Sussex, England. 
 Newstead Abbey fernery, Nottinghamshire
 Rock Cliff, Bawdsey Manor, Suffolk
 Water Garden, Highnam Court, Gloucester
 Zig-zag Path, Lower Leas Coastal Park, Folkestone
 Rosshall Park, Glasgow
 Gardens at Waddesdon Manor, Buckinghamshire
 Heythrop Park, Oxfordshire
 Fernery at Danesbury Park, Hertfordshire.
 Waterfall at Battersea Park, London.
 Gardens at Coombe Wood, Croydon.
 Colney Hall near Norwich
 Cliffs at North Shore, Blackpool
 Former Terraced Gardens, Rivington, Lancashire.

Gallery

See also
Cast stone
Folly

References

External links
The Pulham Legacy
Durability Guaranteed – Pulhamite Rockwork pdf file on the English Heritage website.
The Story of Pulhamite Rockwork
Pulham at Waddesdon Manor video

Building stone
Architectural history
Rock formations
Victorian architecture
Gardening in England